Tanner Zipchen is a Canadian actor and host. From 2015 to 2020 he was the host of the Pre-Show for Cineplex Entertainment.

Career
In 2015, Zipchen applied to an open casting call from Canadian theatre chain Cineplex to host their pre-show; a series of short games and interviews played in front of movies at Cineplex theatres. After a lengthy campaign and cross Canada vote, Tanner was voted into the top 3. After completing additional challenges, he ultimately won the vote and was awarded the role of Cineplex Pre-Show Host.

On January 13, 2020 Zipchen announced he had been let go by Cineplex. It was later revealed, in an article about working for exposure in the industry, that since his initial work as host was considered a “prize” and not a job by Cineplex, he was not paid but instead compensated in Scene points, a reward program used by Cineplex to award free movies to its customers.

Along with actively working as an actor, making appearances in The Boys and Private Eyes, Tanner can also be found in the Dark Pictures Anthology game, Little Hope.

Filmography

Film

Television

Personal life
Zipchen was born in Saskatoon, Saskatchewan. He is married to Kelsey Zipchen, who is an on-set teacher in the film and television industry. They both reside in Toronto, Ontario.

References

External links
 
 

Living people
Cineplex Entertainment
Male actors from Saskatoon
Canadian television hosts
Canadian male television actors
21st-century Canadian male actors
Canadian male film actors
Year of birth missing (living people)